Urrea may refer to 

 Urrea de Gaén, a municipality in Teruel, Aragon, Spain
 Urrea de Jalón, a municipality in Zaragoza, Aragon, Spain
Urrea (surname)